Lothair I or Lothar I (Dutch and Medieval Latin: Lotharius; German: Lothar; French: Lothaire; Italian: Lotario) (795 – 29 September 855) was emperor (817–855, co-ruling with his father until 840), and the governor of Bavaria (815–817), King of Italy (818–855) and Middle Francia (840–855).

Lothair was the eldest son of the Carolingian emperor Louis the Pious and his wife Ermengarde of Hesbaye, daughter of Ingerman the duke of Hesbaye. On several occasions, Lothair led his full-brothers Pepin I of Aquitaine and Louis the German in revolt against their father to protest against attempts to make their half-brother Charles the Bald a co-heir to the Frankish domains. Upon the father's death, Charles and Louis joined forces against Lothair in a three-year civil war (840–843). The struggles between the brothers led directly to the breakup of the Frankish Empire assembled by their grandfather Charlemagne, and laid the foundation for the development of modern France and Germany.

Early life and reign 

Lothair was born in 795, to Louis the Pious and Ermengarde of Hesbaye. His father was the son of the reigning Emperor, Charlemagne. Little is known of Lothair's early life, which was probably passed at the court of his grandfather Charlemagne. In 814, the elderly emperor died, and left his sole surviving legitimate son Louis the Pious as successor to his vast empire. The next year, Lothair would be sent to govern Bavaria for his father, the new emperor. In 817, Louis the Pious drew up his Ordinatio Imperii. In this, Louis designated Lothair as his principal heir and ordered that Lothair would be the overlord of Louis' younger sons Pippin of Aquitaine (who was 20) and Louis the German (who was 13), as well as his nephew (Lothair's cousin) Bernard of Italy. Lothair would also inherit their lands if they were to die childless. Lothair, aged 22, was then crowned joint emperor by his father at Aachen. At the same time, Aquitaine and Bavaria were granted to his brothers Pippin and Louis, respectively, as subsidiary kingdoms. Following the death of Bernard, brought on by his plotting against and blinding by Louis the Pious, Lothair also received the Kingdom of Italy. In 821, Lothair married Ermengarde (d. 851), daughter of Hugh the Count of Tours.

In 822, he assumed the government of Italy, and at Easter, 5 April 823, he was crowned emperor again by Pope Paschal I, this time at Rome.  In November 824, Lothair promulgated a statute, the Constitutio Romana, concerning the relations of pope and emperor, which reserved the supreme power to the secular potentate, and he afterwards issued various ordinances for the good government of Italy.

On Lothair's return to his father's court, his stepmother Judith won his consent to her plan for securing a kingdom for her son Charles, a scheme which was carried out in 829, when the young prince was given Alemannia as king. Lothair, however, soon changed his attitude and spent the succeeding decade in constant strife over the division of the Empire with his father. He was alternately master of the Empire, and banished and confined to Italy, at one time taking up arms in alliance with his brothers and at another fighting against them, whilst the bounds of his appointed kingdom were in turn extended and reduced.

Division of the kingdom 

The first rebellion began in 830. All three brothers fought their father, whom they deposed.  In 831, their father was reinstated and he deprived Lothair of his imperial title and gave Italy to Charles. The second rebellion was instigated by Angilbert II, Archbishop of Milan in 833, and again Louis was deposed in 834. Lothair, through the loyalty of the Lombards and later reconciliations, retained Italy and the imperial position through all remaining divisions of the Empire by his father.

When Louis the Pious was dying in 840, he sent the imperial insignia to Lothair, who, disregarding the various partitions, claimed the whole of the Empire. He was 45 years old when his father died. Negotiations with his brother Louis the German and his half-brother Charles, both of whom resisted this claim, were followed by an alliance of the younger brothers against Lothair. A decisive battle was fought at Fontenay-en-Puisaye on 25 June 841, when, in spite of his and his allied nephew Pepin II of Aquitaine's personal gallantry, Lothair was defeated and fled to Aachen. With fresh troops he began a war of plunder, but the forces of his brothers were too strong, and taking with him such treasure as he could collect, he abandoned his capital to them. He met with the leaders of the Stellinga in Speyer and promised them his support in return for theirs, but Louis and then the native Saxon nobility put down the Stellinga in the next years.

Peace negotiations began, and in June 842 the brothers met on an island in the Saône. They agreed to an arrangement which developed, after much difficulty and delay, into the Treaty of Verdun, signed in August 843. By this, Lothair received the imperial title as well as northern Italy and a long stretch of territory from the North Sea to the Mediterranean, essentially along the valleys of the Rhine and the Rhône; this territory includes the regions Lorraine, Alsace, Burgundy, and Provence. He soon ceded Italy to his eldest son, Louis, and remained in his new kingdom, engaging in alternate quarrels and reconciliations with his brothers and in futile efforts to defend his lands from the attacks of the Northmen (as Vikings were known in Frankish writings) and the Saracens (as those loyal to the various Fatimids, Umayyads and Abbasides are known in Frankish writings).

In 845 the count of Arles, Fulcrad, led a rebellion in Provence. The emperor put it down and the count joined him in an expedition against the Saracens in Italy in 846.

Death and aftermath 

In 855 he became seriously ill, and despairing of recovery renounced the throne, divided his lands among his three sons, and on 23 September entered the monastery of Prüm, where he died six days later. He was buried at Prüm, where his remains were found in 1860. It was at Prüm that Lothair was most commemorated.

The same year, Lothair's kingdom was divided between his three sons in a deal called the Treaty of Prüm: the eldest, Louis II, received Italy and the title of emperor; the second, Lothair II, received Lotharingia; the youngest, Charles, received Provence.

Family 

He married Ermengarde of Tours in 821, who died in 851.
Louis II (825–875) Crowned as King of Italy in 844 by Pope Sergius II. Crowned Emperor in 850. Married Engelberga.
Hiltrude (826–865) Married Berengar of Spoleto.
Bertha (c. 830–852) Married to an unknown man, but later Abbess of Avenay.
Gisela (c. 830–856) abbess of San Salvatore at Brescia
Lothair II (835–869) Succeeded his father. Married Teutberga, daughter of Boso the Elder, Count of Arles.
Rotrude (c. 840) Married Lambert III of Nantes.
Charles (845–863) Invested with Provence, Lyon and Transjuranian Burgundy.

One illegitimate child is known.
Carloman (? – d. 853)

References

Citations

Sources 

 Surviving letters of Lothar I, in Latin with English translation by Richard Matthew Pollard.

 1911 Encyclopædia Britannica sources

 Annales Fuldenses
 Nithard, Historiarum Libri, both in the Monumenta Germaniae Historica Scriptores, Bände i. and ii. (Hanover and Berlin, 1826 fol.)
 E. Mühlbacher, Die Regesten des Kaiserreichs unter den Karolingern (Innsbruck, 1881)
 E. Dümmler, Geschichte des ostfränkischen Reichs (Leipzig, 1887–1888)
 B. Simson, Jahrbücher des deutschen Reiches unter Ludwig dem Frommen (Leipzig, 1874–1876)

External links 
 

795 births
855 deaths
9th-century Holy Roman Emperors
9th-century kings of Italy
9th-century dukes of Bavaria
Kings of Bavaria
Frankish warriors
Dukes of Lorraine
Dukes of Maine
Eifel in the Middle Ages
Rebellious princes
Sons of emperors